The Finnish People's Organisation (Finnish: , SKJ) (Swedish: , FFO) was a bilingual Nazi party founded by Jaeger Captain Arvi Kalsta. Supporters of the movement were also called Kalstaites after the leader. The inaugural meeting of the organization was held in March 1933 and was attended by about 500 members. SKJ published the magazines Herää Suomi ('Finland Awake'), Hakkorset and Hakaristi ('Swastika', editor Thorvald Oljemark). In addition to its own magazines, the organization had its own publishing house Vasara. The organization wore a brown uniform like the Sturmabteilung of the German Nazi Party, and used the greeting "Finland Awake!" 

The party received some support among the Swedish-speaking population of Uusimaa. The organization received only 2,733 votes in the 1933 Finnish parliamentary election, with Jaakko Seise receiving almost quarter of the votes. However, at its peak SKJ had 20,000 members. Due to Kalsta moving to Rovaniemi to run a hotel the party ceased its activities in 1936, but Kalsta resumed his Nazi career in 1940 by founding the Organisation of National Socialists.

Sources
  online version

References

External links
 The party program (in Finnish)

Defunct political parties in Finland
Nationalist parties in Finland
Nazi parties
Political parties established in 1933
Nazism in Finland
Banned far-right parties
Anti-communist organisations in Finland